Parisa Fitz-Henley (born July 22, 1977) is a Jamaican-born American actress, best known for her role as Reva Connors in Jessica Jones and Luke Cage. From 2017 to 2018, Fitz-Henley starred in the NBC drama Midnight, Texas.

Early life

Fitz-Henley was born and raised in Kingston, Jamaica, where she attended St Andrew High School.
She won the Fashion Model of the Year award in 1996 from the Pulse modeling agency. Her mother is of English/German/Italian descent and her father’s ethnicity is African & Scottish.

Filmography

Film

Television

References

External links

Living people
American television actresses
American film actresses
21st-century American actresses
1977 births
Jamaican emigrants to the United States
People from Kingston, Jamaica